Pablo Bianchi (born 27 February 1975) is an Argentine former professional tennis player of Uruguayan descent.

Born in Argentina, to a Uruguayan father, Bianchi was a left-handed player and began competing on tour in the mid 1990s, before he became a nationalised Uruguayan in 2001 to compete in the Davis Cup. He was a member of the Uruguay Davis Cup team for two years, winning four of his nine singles rubbers.

Bianchi reached his career high singles world ranking of 287 in 2001 when he made the qualifying draw of the French Open. He won two singles and three doubles titles at ITF Futures level.

ITF Futures titles

Singles: (2)

Doubles: (3)

References

External links
 
 
 

1975 births
Living people
Argentine male tennis players
Argentine people of Uruguayan descent
Sportspeople of Uruguayan descent
People with acquired Uruguayan citizenship
Uruguayan male tennis players